Darcy Ribeiro (October 26, 1922 – February 17, 1997) was a Brazilian anthropologist, historian, sociologist, author and politician. His ideas have influenced several scholars of Brazilian and Latin American studies. As Minister of Education of Brazil he carried out profound reforms which led him to be invited to participate in university reforms in Chile, Peru, Venezuela, Mexico and Uruguay after leaving Brazil due to the 1964 coup d'état.

Biography
Darcy Ribeiro was born in Montes Claros, in the state of Minas Gerais, the son of Reginaldo Ribeiro dos Santos and of Josefina Augusta da Silveira. He completed his primary and secondary education in his native town, at the Grupo Escolar Gonçalves Chaves and at the Ginásio Episcopal de Montes Claros. He is best known for development work in the areas of education, sociology and anthropology and for being, along with his friend and colleague Anísio Teixeira, one of the founders of the University of Brasília in the early 1960s. He also served as the first rector of that university, and the campus is named after him. He was the founder of the State University of Norte Fluminense (Universidade Estadual do Norte Fluminense) as well. He wrote numerous books, many of them about the indigenous populations of Brazil.

During the first mandate of governor Leonel Brizola in Rio de Janeiro (1983–1987), Darcy Ribeiro created, planned and directed the implementation of the "Integrated Centers for Public Instruction" (Centros Integrados de Ensino Público), a visionary and revolutionary pedagogical project of assistance for children, including recreational and cultural activities beyond formal instruction – making concrete the projects envisioned decades earlier by Anísio Teixeira. Long before politicians incorporated the importance of education for the development of Brazil into their discourse, Darcy Ribeiro and Leonel Brizola had already developed these ideals.

In the elections of 1986, Ribeiro was the Democratic Labor Party (PDT) candidate for the governorship of Rio de Janeiro, running against Fernando Gabeira (at that time affiliated with the Workers’ Party), Agnaldo Timóteo of the Social Democratic Party (PDS) and Moreira Franco of the Brazilian Democratic Movement Party (PMDB). Ribeiro was defeated, being unable to overcome the high approval rating of Moreira who was elected due to the popularity of the then-recent currency reform, the Cruzado Plan (Plano Cruzado). Another defeat was in 1994, when he was Brizola's running-mate in the presidential election; Darcy Ribeiro was also chief of staff (Ministro-chefe da Casa Civil) in the cabinet of President João Goulart, vice-governor of Rio de Janeiro from 1983 to 1987 and exercised the mandate of senator from Rio de Janeiro from 1991 until his death. Darcy Ribeiro was elected to the Brazilian Academy of Letters (Academia Brasileira de Letras) on October 8, 1992. His election was to Chair Number 11, which has as its Patron Fagundes Varela. He was formally received into the Academy on April 15, 1993, by author Cândido Mendes. He died in Brasília, aged 74.

Thought

Darcy Ribeiro's ideas belonged to the evolutionist school of sociology and anthropology, and his main influences were Neoevolutionists Leslie White and Julian Steward, and the Marxist archeologist V. Gordon Childe. He believed that people went through a "civilizatory process" beginning as hunter-gatherers. This "civilizatory process" was according to him marked by technological revolutions, and among these he stress the eight more important as the following:
the agricultural revolution
the urban revolution
the irrigation revolution
the metallurgic revolution
the livestock revolution
the mercantile revolution
the industrial revolution
the thermonuclear revolution

Ribeiro proposed also a classification scheme for Latin American countries where he identified "New Peoples" (Chile, Colombia, Paraguay, Venezuela etc.), that merged from the mix of several cultures; "Testimony Peoples" (Peru, Mexico, Ecuador, Guatemala and Bolivia), remnants of ancient civilizations; and Argentina and Uruguay, former "New Peoples" that became "Transplantated Peoples", essentially European, after massive immigration.<ref name=Larrain>Larraín, Jorge. Identidad chilena. 2001. Editorial LOM.</ref>

Selected works

 EthnologyCulturas e línguas indígenas do Brasil – 1957Arte plumária dos índios Kaapo – 1957A política indigenista brasileira – 1962Os índios e a civilização – 1970Uira sai, à procura de Deus – 1974Configurações histórico-culturais dos povos americanos – 1975Suma etnológica brasileira – 1986 (colaboração; três volumes).Diários índios – os urubus-kaapor – 1996

 Anthropology O processo civilizatório – etapas da evolução sócio-cultural – 1968As Américas e a civilização – processo de formação e causas do desenvolvimento cultural desigual dos povos americanos – 1970Os índios e a civilização – a integração das populações indígenas no Brasil moderno – 1970The culture – historical configurations of the American peoples – 1970 Os brasileiros – teoria do Brasil – 1972O dilema da América Latina – estruturas do poder e forças insurgentes – 1978O povo brasileiro – a formação e o sentido do Brasil – 1995

 RomancesMaíra – 1976O mulo – 1981Utopia selvagem – 1982Migo – 1988

 EssaysKadiwéu – ensaios etnológicos sobre o saber, o azar e a beleza – 1950Configurações histórico-culturais dos povos americanos – 1975Sobre o óbvio - ensaios insólitos – 1979Aos trancos e barrancos – como o Brasil deu no que deu – 1985América Latina: a pátria grande – 1986Testemunho – 1990A fundação do Brasil – 1500/1700 – 1992 (colaboração)O Brasil como problema – 1995Noções de coisas – 1995

 EducationPlano orientador da Universidade de Brasília – 1962A universidade necessária – 1969Propuestas – acerca da la renovación – 1970Université des Sciences Humaines d'Alger – 1972La universidad peruana – 1974UnB – invenção e descaminho – 1978Nossa escola é uma calamidade – 1984Universidade do terceiro milênio – plano orientador da Universidade Estadual do Norte Fluminense – 1993

ReferencesThis article incorporates material translated from the Darcy Ribeiro article in the Portuguese language Wikipedia.''

External links
Profile at the official site of the Brazilian Academy of Letters
Fundação Darcy Ribeiro

|-

|-

|-

Brazilian anthropologists
Brazilian ethnologists
1922 births
1997 deaths
Vice Governors of Rio de Janeiro (state)
Democratic Labour Party (Brazil) politicians
Education Ministers of Brazil
Deaths from cancer in Federal District (Brazil)
People from Montes Claros
20th-century anthropologists
Rectors of universities in Brazil
Candidates for Vice President of Brazil